Wes Gordon (born 1988) is an American fashion designer. Born in Chicago, Illinois, Gordon was raised in Atlanta, Georgia. He attended the Lovett School in Atlanta and graduated in 2005. He interned with Oscar de la Renta and Tom Ford and after graduating from Central St. Martins in London in 2009, the same year launched his own self named line of women's wear.  The department stores Harrods and Saks Fifth Avenue stocked his designs, followed by Bergdorf Goodman and Kirna Zabête the following year. Katy Perry, January Jones, Lena Dunham and Gwyneth Paltrow have all worn his designs.

At Carolina Herrera
In 2018 Gordon took over from Carolina Herrera as creative director at the fashion label.

References

Living people
American fashion designers
The Lovett School alumni
People from Chicago
1988 births